Obed is a given name, following the biblical figure Obed. It may also serve as a surname. Notable people with the name include:

Given name
John Obed Howard (born 1928), a lightweight professional boxer from Canada
Obed Ariri (born 1956), a former American football placekicker
Obed Asamoah (born 1936), a politician from Ghana
Obed Cétoute (born 1983), a Canadian gridiron football player
Obed Crosby Haycock (1901–1983), a scientist and educator
Obed Dlamini (born 1937), Prime Minister of Swaziland 1989–1993
Obed Enamorado (born 1985), a Honduran football goalkeeper
Obie Fernandez, author, computer programmer, American
Obed Gómez (born 1966), a Puerto Rican artist of modern art
Obed Hall (1757–1828), a United States Representative from New Hampshire
Obed Hussey (1792–1860), an American inventor
Obed McCoy (born 1997), a Vincentian cricketer
Obed Mlaba, mayor of the eThekwini, South Africa
Obed Mutanya (born 1981), a Zambian long-distance and cross country runner
Obed Nicholls (1885–1962), a Cornish artist in copper repousse
Obed Sullivan, (born 1968), a heavyweight boxer
Obed Vargas (born 2005), an American professional soccer player

Surname
Elisha Obed (born 1952), a Bahamanian boxer
Z. Obed, a politician from Nagaland, India

See also

Obed (disambiguation)
Oved, a spelling variant of the name